The Banana Massacre was a massacre of United Fruit Company workers that occurred between December 5 and 6, 1928 in the town of Ciénaga near Santa Marta, Colombia. A strike began on November 12, 1928, when the workers ceased to work until the company would reach an agreement with them to grant them dignified working conditions. After several weeks with no agreement, in which the United Fruit Company refused to negotiate with the workers, the conservative government of Miguel Abadía Méndez sent the Colombian Army in against the strikers, resulting in the massacre of 47 to 2,000 people.

U.S. officials in Colombia and United Fruit representatives portrayed the workers' strike as "communist" with a "subversive tendency" in telegrams to Frank B. Kellogg, the United States Secretary of State. The Colombian government was also compelled to work for the interests of the company, considering they could cut off trade of Colombian bananas with significant markets such as the United States and Europe.

Gabriel García Márquez depicted a fictional version of the massacre in his novel One Hundred Years of Solitude, as did Álvaro Cepeda Samudio in his La Casa Grande. Although García Márquez references the number of dead as around three thousand, the actual number of dead workers is unknown.

Strike
The workers of the banana plantations in Colombia went on strike on November 12, 1928.  The workers made nine demands from the United Fruit Company:

 Stop their practice of hiring through sub-contractors
 Mandatory collective insurance
 Compensation for work accidents
 Hygienic dormitories and 6 day work weeks
 Increase in daily pay for workers who earned less than 100 pesos per month
 Weekly wage
 Abolition of office stores
 Abolition of payment through coupons rather than money
 Improvement of hospital services

The strike turned into the largest labor movement ever witnessed in the country until then. Radical members of the Liberal Party, as well as members of the Socialist and Communist Parties, participated.

The workers wanted to be recognized as employees, and demanded the implementation of the Colombian legal framework of the 1920s.

Massacre
An army regiment from Bogotá was dispatched by the government to deal with the strikers, which it deemed to be subversive. Whether these troops were sent in at the behest of the United Fruit Company did not at first clearly emerge.

Three hundred soldiers were sent from Antioquia to Magdalena. There were no soldiers from Magdalena involved because General Cortes Vargas, the army-appointed military chief of the banana zone in charge of controlling the situation, did not believe they would be able to take effective actions, as they might be related to the plantation workers.

The troops set up their machine guns on the roofs of the low buildings at the corners of the main square, closed off the access streets,
and, after issuing a five-minute warning that people should leave, opened fire into a dense Sunday crowd of workers and their families including children. The people had gathered after Sunday Mass to wait for an anticipated address from the governor.

Number of people dead
General Cortés Vargas, who commanded the troops during the massacre, took responsibility for 47 casualties. In reality, the exact number of casualties has never been confirmed. Herrera Soto, co-author of a comprehensive and detailed study of the 1928 strike, has put together various estimates given by contemporaries and historians, ranging from 47 to as high as 2,000. According to Congressman Jorge Eliécer Gaitán, the killed strikers were thrown into the sea. Other sources claim that the bodies were buried in mass graves.

Among the survivors was Luis Vicente Gámez, later a famous local figure, who survived by hiding under a bridge for three days. Every year after the massacre he delivered a memorial service over the radio.

The press has reported different numbers of deaths and different opinions about the events that took place that night. The conclusion is that there is no agreed-on story, but rather diverse variations depending on the source they come from. The American press provided biased information on the strike. The Colombian press was also biased depending on the political alignment of the publication. For example, the  Bogotá-based newspaper El Tiempo stated that the workers were within their rights in wanting to improve their conditions. However, since the newspaper was politically conservative, they also noted that they did not agree with the strike.

Official U.S. telegrams

Telegram from Bogotá Embassy to the U.S. Secretary of State, Frank B. Kellogg, dated December 5, 1928, stated:

Telegram from Santa Marta Consulate to the U.S. Secretary of State, dated December 6, 1928, stated:

Telegram from Bogotá Embassy to the U.S. Secretary of State, dated December 7, 1928, stated:

Telegram from the U.S. Department of State to Santa Marta Consulate, dated December 8, 1928, stated:

Telegram from Santa Marta Consulate to the U.S. Secretary of State, dated December 9, 1928, stated:

Dispatch from Santa Marta Consulate to the U.S. Secretary of State, dated December 11, 1928, stated:

Dispatch from Bogotá Embassy to the U.S. Secretary of State, dated December 11, 1928, stated:

Dispatch from U.S. Bogotá Embassy to the U.S. Secretary of State, dated December 29, 1928, stated:

Dispatch from U.S. Bogotá Embassy to the US Secretary of State, dated January 16, 1929, stated:

Consequences
Guerrilla movements in Colombia such as the Revolutionary Armed Forces of Colombia (FARC) argued that the growth of Communism in Colombia was triggered by atrocities like these, and called it state terrorism.

Some sources claim there are connections between this massacre and the atrocities committed in more recent years by Chiquita Brands in Colombian territory. Chiquita admitted paying 1.7 million dollars to the paramilitary group AUC (United Self Defense Forces of Colombia), who have killed hundreds of Colombian citizens. This company has financed war machines by paying this terrorist group. They claimed that they had been victims of extortion and said the payments were made as a way to protect their workers from the paramilitaries, but the people seem to object. In the documentary “Banana Land” Colombian plantain workers speak up about how they feel terrorized by multinational companies like Chiquita and their work with paramilitaries. They even say that people who speak up about the way they feel are at risk of being targeted by the AUC.

In popular culture 
Gabriel García Márquez depicted a fictional version of the massacre in his novel One Hundred Years of Solitude, as did Álvaro Cepeda Samudio in his La Casa Grande. Although García Márquez references the number of dead as around three thousand, the actual number of dead workers is unknown.

The event also inspired Italian singer-songwriter Francesco De Gregori's song Ninetto e la colonia, released with his 1976 album Bufalo Bill. Before the soldiers start shooting on the frightened and praying crowd, only Ninetto scemo, a silly little child, due to his innocence, is able to ask the relevant question, though in vain: "Who are those who sent you?" The soldier replies that the answer does not matter, as those who sent him do not speak their language and live far away.

See also

Tlatelolco massacre

Notes

External links
 The Santa Marta Massacre
 Gabriel García Márquez and His Approach to History in One Hundred Years of Solitude
 Chiquita brands and their actions in Colombia
 This Day In HISTORY: December 06, 1928 Banana Massacre The History Channel.

1928 in Colombia
1928 labor disputes and strikes
December 1928 events
Massacres in 1928
Massacres in Colombia
Labor disputes in Colombia
Political repression in Colombia
Santa Marta
Conflicts in 1928
United Fruit Company
Mass murder in 1928
Agriculture and forestry strikes
United Fruit Company labor relations